is located around Mount Takao in Hachiōji, Tokyo, Japan. Established in 1967 to commemorate the centennial celebrations of the accession of Emperor Meiji, it is the smallest of the Quasi-National Parks. Next in size is the coeval Meiji no Mori Minō Quasi-National Park in Ōsaka Prefecture, to which the park is connected by the Tōkai Nature Trail.

Mount Takao, rising to 599 m above sea level, is a massif of low mountains formed in the Mesozoic era. The area is a celebrated habitat of a wide variety of birds and insects.

See also

 List of national parks of Japan
 Meiji period

References

National parks of Japan
Parks and gardens in Tokyo
Protected areas established in 1967
1967 establishments in Japan